Hans Rosling (27 July 1948 – 7 February 2017) was a Swedish physician, academic and public speaker. He was a professor of international health at Karolinska Institute and was the co-founder and chairman of the Gapminder Foundation, which developed the Trendalyzer software system. He held presentations around the world, including several TED Talks in which he promoted the use of data (and data visualization) to explore development issues. His posthumously published book Factfulness, coauthored with his daughter-in-law Anna Rosling Rönnlund and son Ola Rosling, became an international bestseller.

Life and career
Rosling was born in Uppsala, Sweden, on 28 July 1948. From 1967 to 1974, he studied statistics and medicine at Uppsala University, and in 1972 he studied public health at St. John's Medical College, Bangalore, India. He became a licensed physician in 1976 and from 1979 to 1981 he served as District Medical Officer in Nacala in northern Mozambique. In 1981, he began investigating an outbreak of konzo, a paralytic disease first described in the Democratic Republic of the Congo. His investigations earned him a Ph.D. at Uppsala University in 1986. Rosling was dyslexic.

Rosling presented the television documentary The Joy of Stats, which was broadcast in the United Kingdom by BBC Four in December 2010 and has been made available to 'catch up' on BBC iPlayer since. He presented a documentary Don't Panic — The Truth about Population for the This World series using a Musion 3D projection display, which appeared on BBC Two in the UK in November 2013. In 2015 he presented the documentary Don't Panic: How to End Poverty in 15 Years, which was produced by Wingspan and aired on the BBC just ahead of the announcement of the UN's Sustainable Development Goals.

Rosling was a sword swallower, as demonstrated in the final moments of his second talk at the TED conference. In 2009 he was listed as one of 100 leading global thinkers by Foreign Policy, and in 2011 as one of 100 most creative people in business by Fast Company. In 2011 he was elected member of the Swedish Academy of Engineering Sciences and in 2012 as member of the Swedish Academy of Sciences. He was included in the Time 100 list of the world's 100 most influential people in 2012.

Work in healthcare
Rosling spent two decades studying outbreaks of konzo, a paralytic disease, in remote rural areas across Africa and supervised more than ten PhD students. His work with Julie Cliff, Johannes Mårtensson, Per Lundqvist, and Bo Sörbo found that outbreaks occur among hunger-stricken rural populations in Africa where a diet dominated by insufficiently processed cassava results in simultaneous malnutrition and high dietary cyanide intake.

Rosling's research also concerned other links between economic development, agriculture, poverty and health. He was a health adviser to the World Health Organization, UNICEF and several aid agencies. In 1993 he was one of the initiators of Médecins Sans Frontières in Sweden. At Karolinska Institutet he was head of the Division of International Health (IHCAR) from 2001 to 2007. As chairman of the Karolinska International Research and Training Committee (1998–2004), he started health research collaborations with universities in Asia, Africa, the Middle East, and Latin America. He started new courses on global health and co-authored a textbook on global health that promotes a fact-based worldview.

Trendalyzer and Gapminder

Rosling's son, Ola Rosling, built the Trendalyzer software to animate data compiled by the UN and the World Bank that helped him explain the world with graphics. Rosling co-founded the Gapminder Foundation together with his son Ola and daughter-in-law Anna Rosling Rönnlund to develop Trendalyzer to convert international statistics into moving, interactive graphics. The provocative presentations that have resulted have made him famous, and his lectures using Gapminder graphics to visualize world development have won awards. The interactive animations are freely available from the Foundation's website.

 
In March 2007, Google acquired the Trendalyzer software with the intention to scale it up and make it freely available for public statistics. In 2008, Google made available a Motion Chart
Google Gadget and in 2009 the Public Data Explorer.

Personal life and death
When he was 20, in 1968, doctors told  Rosling that there was something wrong with his liver and as a consequence, he stopped drinking alcohol. Aged 29, with a young family, he had testicular cancer which was successfully treated. In 1989, he was diagnosed with hepatitis C. Over the years this progressed and he developed liver cirrhosis. At the beginning of 2013, he was in the early stages of liver failure. However, at the same time, new hepatitis C drugs were released and he went to Japan to buy the drugs needed to treat the infection. He expressed concerns in the media over the restricted use of the new drugs due to high costs, stating that it is a crime not to give every person with hepatitis C access to the drugs.

Rosling was diagnosed with pancreatic cancer in 2016, and died of the disease on 7 February 2017.

Awards

2006 – Enlightener of the Year from the Swedish Skeptics Association
2010 – The Gannon Award for the Continued Pursuit of Human Advancement (US)
2010 – Illis quorum medal

2012 – Time 100 most influential people list
2012 – Harvard Humanitarian Award

2014 – Honorary Doctor at Uppsala University, Sweden
2014 – The Patron's Medal from the Royal Geographical Society of London
2017 – United Nations Population Award

Reception of Rosling's views
Rosling is commonly described as an optimist, though he personally rejected the label. In his posthumous book Factfulness: Ten Reasons We're Wrong About the World – and Why Things Are Better Than You Think he wrote "The five global risks that concern me most are the risks of a global pandemic, financial collapse, world war, climate change, and extreme poverty." In summary, he wrote, "People often call me an optimist, because I show them the enormous progress they didn't know about. That makes me angry. I'm not an optimist. That makes me sound naive. I'm a very serious "possibilist". That's something I made up. It means someone who neither hopes without reason, nor fears without reason, someone who constantly resists the overdramatic worldview. As a possibilist, I see all this progress, and it fills me with conviction and hope that further progress is possible. This is not optimistic. It is having a clear and reasonable idea about how things are. It is having a worldview that is constructive and useful."

In his later years he advocated on behalf of refugees from Syria and partnered with the United Nations High Commissioner for Refugees (UNHCR) in this effort. In his last book he wrote repeatedly about the tragedy of the war in Syria saying: "The Syrian conflict will most likely prove to be the deadliest in the world since the Ethiopian-Eritrean war of 1998 to 2000."

However, some experts consider Rosling's world-view excessively rose-tinted, or anti-environmental. For instance, in The One-Sided Worldview of Hans Rosling Christian Berggren, a Swedish professor of industrial management, argues that Factfulness, "presents a highly biased sample of statistics as the true perspective on global development, avoids analysis of negative trends, and refrains from discussing difficult issues". Seeing Rosling as more optimist than "possibilist", Berggren remarks that, "Factfulness includes many graphs of 'bad things in decline' and 'good things on the rise' but not a single graph of 'bad things on the rise'." In 2013 in The Ecologist Robin Maynard reported Rosling as raging against the UN's population projections, and against some ecological objections to development: "I don't give a damn about polar bears! I can live without polar bears."

Hence, Rosling has been criticized as being Pollyannaist about the global political situation in the face of tragedies such as the long-running conflict in Syria, among others. His work on population growth has also been criticized by Paul R. Ehrlich, the U.S. biologist and Professor of Population Studies at Stanford University, and Anne H. Ehrlich, associate director of the Center for Conservation Biology at Stanford University, in an article, published online by the MAHB, titled "A Confused Statistician." The Ehrlichs also warn that, while some trends that Rosling cites may indeed be positive, there is the possibility of total collapse of those trends if social and political instabilities occur.

Selected publications 

Rosling, H.; Härgestam, F. (2020). How I Learned to Understand the World: A Memoir. Flatiron Books. p. 256.

References

External links

Hans Rosling shows the best stats you've ever seen at the 2006 TED Conference in Monterey, CA highlighting novel ways of presenting global statistics.
Hans Rosling's new insights on poverty, from TED2007, featuring a surprise ending. (video)
Hans Rosling's blog
Ola Rosling giving a Gapminder presentation at Google (video)
Motion Chart Google Gadget
Hans Rosling: Global health expert; data visionary profile on TED.com

1948 births
2017 deaths
People from Uppsala
Academic staff of the Karolinska Institute
Swedish bloggers
Sword swallowers
Swedish public health doctors
Swedish statisticians
Scientists with dyslexia
Articles containing video clips
Deaths from cancer in Sweden
Deaths from pancreatic cancer
Recipients of the Royal Geographical Society Patron's Medal
Recipients of the Illis quorum